The Penita Formation is a geologic formation in Costa Rica. It preserves fossils dating back to the Neogene period.

See also

 List of fossiliferous stratigraphic units in Costa Rica

References
 

Neogene Costa Rica